Jeanne Goupil (born April 4, 1950) is a French television and film actress from Soisy-sous-Montmorency who known for the Don't Deliver Us from Evil (1971), Cookies (1975) and The Grocer's Son (2007).

Filmography
Don't Deliver Us from Evil (1971)
Charlie et ses deux nénettes
(1973)
Cookies (1975)
Marie, the Doll (1976)
The Bait (1995)
The Grocer's Son (2007)

References

External links

1950 births
Living people
20th-century French actresses
21st-century French actresses
French television actresses
French film actresses